Smith-Ely Mansion is a historic home located at Clyde in Wayne County, New York.  It is a large, 2½-story brick masonry residence featuring elements of the Classical Revival style. The original house was built about 1850 and extensively altered in 1875–1877.  That renovation added an extensive verandah and 3-story tower.  The front is dominated by a colossal, four-columned portico added during a renovation dated to 1908–1911.

The Erie Mansion has been known through the years as the Smith-Ely Mansion. Today it has been transformed into a bed and breakfast and renamed The Erie Mansion.

It was listed on the National Register of Historic Places in 1992.

References

Houses on the National Register of Historic Places in New York (state)
Neoclassical architecture in New York (state)
Houses completed in 1911
Houses in Wayne County, New York
National Register of Historic Places in Wayne County, New York